Kanrud (also Romanized as Kānrūd; also known as Ganrud) is a village in Lavandevil Rural District, Lavandevil District, Astara County, Gilan Province, Iran. At the 2006 census, its population was 2,618, in 620 families.

Language 
Linguistic composition of the village.

Tourism 
Imamzadeh Ebrahim and qassim shrine thats are Musa al-Kadhim sons is in this village. the old shrine is replace in few years ago

References 

Populated places in Astara County

Azerbaijani settlements in Gilan Province

Talysh settlements in Gilan Province